Matthew de Boer (born 10 March 1990) is an Australian rules footballer with the Greater Western Sydney Giants in the Australian Football League (AFL).

After representing Western Australia at the 2008 AFL Under 18 Championships and being named in the under 18 All-Australian team, de Boer was drafted to Fremantle in the 2009 rookie draft with Fremantle's second selection, number 19 overall.  After displaying good form during the 2009 pre-season, he was elevated to Fremantle's senior list as a nominated rookie, along with Greg Broughton.

De Boer made his AFL debut for Fremantle in round 6 of the 2009 AFL season at Subiaco Oval in the Western Derby against the West Coast Eagles, as a replacement for the injured Rhys Palmer. He was delisted at the conclusion of the 2016 season, however, he was drafted by Greater Western Sydney in the 2016 AFL draft.

Statistics
 Statistics are correct to the end of the 2018 season

|-
|- style="background-color: #EAEAEA"
! scope="row" style="text-align:center" | 2009
|style="text-align:center;"|
| 40 || 17 || 5 || 4 || 89 || 125 || 214 || 56 || 64 || 0.3 || 0.2 || 5.2 || 7.4 || 12.6 || 3.3 || 3.8
|-
! scope="row" style="text-align:center" | 2010
|style="text-align:center;"|
| 40 || 20 || 6 || 12 || 92 || 145 || 237 || 56 || 75 || 0.3 || 0.6 || 4.6 || 7.2 || 11.8 || 2.8 || 3.8
|- style="background-color: #EAEAEA"
! scope="row" style="text-align:center" | 2011
|style="text-align:center;"|
| 40 || 16 || 3 || 2 || 84 || 139 || 223 || 43 || 84 || 0.2 || 0.1 || 5.2 || 8.7 || 13.9 || 2.7 || 5.2
|-
! scope="row" style="text-align:center" | 2012
|style="text-align:center;"|
| 40 || 23 || 15 || 10 || 188 || 222 || 410 || 102 || 138 || 0.6 || 0.4 || 8.2 || 9.6 || 17.8 || 4.4 || 6.0
|- style="background-color: #EAEAEA"
! scope="row" style="text-align:center" | 2013
|style="text-align:center;"|
| 9 || 25 || 10 || 7 || 172 || 216 || 388 || 87 || 145 || 0.4 || 0.3 || 6.9 || 8.6 || 15.5 || 3.5 || 5.8
|-
! scope="row" style="text-align:center" | 2014
|style="text-align:center;"|
| 9 || 14 || 4 || 2 || 96 || 126 || 222 || 42 || 78 || 0.3 || 0.1 || 6.9 || 9.0 || 15.9 || 3.0 || 5.6
|- style="background-color: #EAEAEA"
! scope="row" style="text-align:center" | 2015
|style="text-align:center;"|
| 9 || 19 || 4 || 2 || 92 || 158 || 250 || 55 || 106 || 0.2 || 0.1 || 4.8 || 8.3 || 13.2 || 2.9 || 5.6
|-
! scope="row" style="text-align:center" | 2016
|style="text-align:center;"|
| 9 || 4 || 1 || 0 || 17 || 43 || 60 || 11 || 27 || 0.2 || 0.0 || 4.2 || 10.8 || 15.0 || 2.8 || 6.8
|-
|- style="background-color: #EAEAEA"
! scope="row" style="text-align:center" | 2017
|style="text-align:center;"|
| 24 || 15 || 8 || 3 || 65 || 142 || 207 || 39 || 70 || 0.5 || 0.2 || 4.3 || 9.5 || 13.8 || 2.6 || 4.7
|-
! scope="row" style="text-align:center" | 2018
|style="text-align:center;"|
| 24 || 15 || 14 || 6 || 102 || 181 || 283 || 51 || 61 || 0.9 || 0.4 || 6.8 || 12.1 || 18.9 || 3.4 || 4.1
|-
|}

References

External links

Matt de Boer player profile page at WAFL FootyFacts
WAFL Player Profile and Statistics

1990 births
Living people
Fremantle Football Club players
Claremont Football Club players
Australian rules footballers from Western Australia
Australian people of Dutch descent
People educated at John XXIII College, Perth
Peel Thunder Football Club players
Greater Western Sydney Giants players